Boxing at the Pacific Games has been contested since 1963 when it was included as one of ten sports at the First South Pacific Games held in Suva, Fiji. There are presently ten weight classes for the men's competition at the Pacific Games, known as the South Pacific Games prior to 2011, in accordance with the (amateur) International Boxing Association (AIBA) classifications.

Boxing has also been included in many of the Pacific Mini Games, starting with the first edition held at Honiara in 1981.

Pacific Games
The boxing weight classes contested at each Pacific Games are listed in the table below. Flag icons and three letter country code indicate the nationality of the gold medal winner of an event, where this information is known; otherwise an (X) is used. Moving the cursor onto a country code with a dotted underline will reveal the name of the gold medal winner.  A dash (–) indicates a weight division that was not contested.

Men

Women

Pacific Mini Games
The boxing weight classes contested at each Pacific Mini Games are listed in the table below. Flag icons and three letter country code indicate the nationality of the gold medal winner of an event, where this information is known; otherwise an (X) is used. Moving the cursor onto a country code with a dotted underline will reveal the name of the gold medal winner.  A dash (–) indicates a weight division that was not contested.

Men's boxing

See also
Boxing at the Commonwealth Games
Boxing at the Summer Olympics

Notes

References

External links
 South Pacific Games index on amateur-boxing.strefa.pl
 

 
Pacific Games
Pacific Games